Pine Plains may refer to:
 Pine Plains (CDP), New York
 Pine Plains (town), New York
 Another term for Pine barrens